Fabio Viteritti (born 22 May 1993) is a German professional footballer who plays as a midfielder for Austrian club FC Black Stars Basel.

Personal life
Viteritti was born in Lörrach, Baden-Württemberg and is of Italian descent.

References

External links
 
 

1993 births
Living people
People from Lörrach
Sportspeople from Freiburg (region)
German sportspeople of Italian descent
Footballers from Baden-Württemberg
German footballers
Association football midfielders
3. Liga players
Regionalliga players
2. Liga (Austria) players
1. FC Magdeburg players
TSG Neustrelitz players
FC Energie Cottbus players
FSV Zwickau players
FC Wacker Innsbruck (2002) players
FC Black Stars Basel players
German expatriate footballers
German expatriate sportspeople in Switzerland
Expatriate footballers in Switzerland
German expatriate sportspeople in Austria
Expatriate footballers in Austria